Plachy Hall is a basketball arena located in Alamosa, Colorado which serves as the home arena for the Adams State Grizzlies basketball team. The arena seats around 500.

References

Basketball venues in Colorado
Buildings and structures in Alamosa, Colorado
Adams State University